Frank Hanisch (born 6 November 1953, in Berlin) is a former professional German footballer.

In the 1970s, Hanisch made a total of 67 Bundesliga appearances for Hertha BSC before later moving to Wuppertaler SV and Tennis Borussia Berlin.

His brother, Klaus-Peter Hanisch (1952–2009), was also a professional footballer.

References

External links 
 

1953 births
Living people
Footballers from Berlin
German footballers
Association football defenders
Bundesliga players
2. Bundesliga players
Hertha BSC players
Wuppertaler SV players
Tennis Borussia Berlin players